Packerton may refer to:

Packerton, Indiana, an unincorporated community in Kosciusko County
Packerton, Pennsylvania, a village in Carbon County